Jens Jakob Dyhr Thomasen (born 25 June 1996) is a Danish professional footballer who plays as a midfielder for French Ligue 2 club Nîmes Olympique.

Club career

Early career
Born in Sanderum, a suburb of Odense, Thomas started playing football in the youth of Sanderum Boldklub before moving to the Odense Boldklub (OB) youth academy at age 11.

OB
On 24 April 2015, Thomasen made his debut for OB in a 2–0 win over Esbjerg fB in the Danish Superliga. Surprisingly he was in the starting lineup and was not even a part of the first team squad yet. He played the first 62 minutes before being replaced by Mathias Greve.

In the summer of 2015, at the age of 19, Thomasen was moved permanently to the first team squad.

On 1 November 2015, Thomasen signed a contract extension until 2019. Thomasen was named as the "Revelation of the Year" in OB for 2016. His contract was extended another two-and-a-half years in January 2018. Thomasen announced in May 2022 that he would leave OB because he was looking for a new challenge and because his contract was about to expire.

Nîmes
On 8 July 2022, French Ligue 2 club Nîmes Olympique confirmed that Thomasen had joined the club on a one-year contract with the possibility of a further one-year extension. He made his official debut for the club on 30 July 2022 in a 1–0 defeat against Caen in Ligue 2.

References

External links
 
 

1996 births
Living people
Danish men's footballers
Footballers from Odense
Association football midfielders
Denmark under-21 international footballers
Denmark youth international footballers
Danish Superliga players
Ligue 2 players
Odense Boldklub players
Nîmes Olympique players
Danish expatriate men's footballers
Danish expatriate sportspeople in France
Expatriate footballers in France